The Cormack-Lehane system classifies views obtained by direct laryngoscopy based on the structures seen. It was initially described by R.S. Cormack and J. Lehane in 1984 as a way of simulating potential scenarios that trainee anaesthetists might face. A modified version that subdivided Grade 2 was initially described in 1998.

See also 
 Mallampati score
 Simplified Airway Risk Index
 Thyromental distance

References

Anesthesia
Medical scoring system